Calabresella, Calabragh, sometimes spelt Calabrasella, "the little Calabrian game", also known as Terziglio, is an Italian trick-taking card game variation of Tressette for three players, but it can be played by four with the dealer receiving no cards for the hand. One of the earliest references of the game dates from 1822.

Object 

The overall aim is to be the first to make a score of 21 points. In each deal, one person plays against the other two with the aim of capturing in tricks cards totalling at least 6 of the 11 points available for counters and the last trick. The soloist is determined by auction and each successive bid must be higher than the last. A player who has once passed may not come in again. The game moves to the right of the dealer and the bids from low to high are:

Calabresella is played with an Italian pack, consisting of a King (Re), Knight/Cavalier (Cavallo, literally meaning Horse), and a Knave (Fante, literally meaning Footsoldier) and the pip cards 7, 6, 5, 4, 3, 2, ace in 4 suits of Batons (Bastoni), Swords (Spade), Cups (Coppe) and Coins (Danari). The rather unusual rank of the cards goes as follows:

3-2-A-R-C-F-7-6-5-4.

Rules 

One player plays against the other two, paying to each or receiving from each the difference between the number of points that he and they hold. Each player receives twelve cards, dealt four at a time. The remainder forms the stock, which is left face downwards.

Chiamo: The Soloist may demand any card he chooses, giving a card in exchange. If the three demanded is in the stock, no other card may be asked for before exchanging cards in the stock.
Solo: The Soloist exchanges cards with the stock but does not call a card.
Solissimo: In a normal Solissimo, no one sees the monte cards until they are won by the winner of the last trick at the end of the play. The soloist not only plays without the stock, or monte, but even allows the opponents to use it. He may choose to increase the stake by saying dividete or scegliete, which turns the game into a Solissimo aggravato.
Solissimo dividete: If he says "half each" the other players exchange exactly 2 cards each with the stock without showing them, and makes any two discards face down.
Solissimo scegliete: if he says "you choose" the other players turn the four cards face up on the table and may agree to split them 2-2, 3-1, or 4-0, and each discards face down as many as he took.

The dealer has the last option. If one person announces the highest contract, the others combine against him. If all decline to play, the deal passes and the hands are abandoned.

The play 

The player on the dealer's left leads first. The highest card wins the trick, there being no trumps. Players must follow suit if possible. The single player and the allies, respectively, collect all the tricks they win.

Scoring 

The values of the cards are:

Each ace is worth 1 point.
3,2 and Court Cards are worth 1/3 of a point.

Card points are used to calculate who won the game. If the soloist won at least 6 points, he is credited with the score for the games:

Chiamo (Call): 1 game point
Solo: 2 game points
Solissimo: 4 game points
Solissimo aggravato:
Solissimo dividete: 8 game points
Solissimo sceliete: 16 game points.

The card points are not added to game points, but are only used to calculate who wins the game.

Cappotto: if the bidder wins or loses all the tricks, the amount won or lost is doubled.
Stramazzo: if the bidder wins all the points without winning all the tricks, or if he loses all the points without losing all the tricks, that is, if the tricks won by the losing side contain less than one point, the amount won or lost is then multiplied by three.

See also 

Trappola
Tarot
Truc

References

External links 

Card games introduced in the 1820s
Italian card games
Three-player card games
Solo card games
Tresette group
Year of introduction missing